Petar Đorđević Džoda (Serbian Cyrillic: Петар Ђорђевић Џода; c. 1780-1813) was a high-ranking commander (voivode) in Karađorđe's army during the First Serbian Uprising against the Ottoman Empire. He was killed in battle in 1813.

Petar Đorđević Džoda was first a boluk-bashi before being promoted to the rank of voivode of Crna River (Crna Reka).

Voivode Petar Đorđević Džoda of Crni Timok district was a native of Stenjevac in the Ćuprija district. During the First Serbian Uprising, in 1809, the Voivode of Crna Reka, Petar Đorđević Džoda, defended the fortified Krivelj from the Turks for two months, which enabled the withdrawal of the Serbian army from Poreč and Timok too. That valiant action would garner him a promotion.

Hajduk Veljko and Petar Đorđević Džoda, who was Veljko's subordinate, were once friends, but soon became rivals. It was during the time when Džoda was appointed duke of Vrazogrnac in 1811 that Hajduk Veljko, could not bear to see his former subordinate become equal in rank, publicly expressed his dismay and contempt for Džoda. That conflict between the two former friends spread among their units, affecting temporarily the morale of the men.

Sources
 Serbian Learned Society 
 "The Memoirs of Matija Nenadović"

References 

1780 births
1813 deaths